Lokavec is the name of a few settlements in Slovenia:

 Lokavec, Ajdovščina, in the Municipality of Ajdovščina
 Lokavec, Laško, in the Municipality of Laško
 Lokavec, Sveta Ana, in the Municipality of Sveta Ana

See also
 Lokovec
 Lukavec (disambiguation)